TMA Solutions is a  privately owned software outsourcing company of Vietnam, with headquarters in Ho Chi Minh City, Vietnam and other offices in Canada, United States, Australia, Singapore, Japan, Germany. TMA Solutions is one of the largest offshore software providers in Vietnam. In 2021, TMA reached 3,000 employees and was recognized as one of Vietnam’s Top 10 Industry 4.0 companies

History 

TMA was founded in 1997 with six engineers. From 1998 to 2004, TMA has three offices with 300 engineers, and new customers from Europe, Australia, Singapore and India. On the list of 15 global companies with “Offshore Software Outsourcing Best Practices” (Aberdeen Group's report). 
In 2005, TMA opened the first oversea office in Canada and became an international company providing software outsourcing. Between 2006 and 2008, TMA opened three new overseas offices in Japan, United States, and Europe. Achieved TL9000 and became Microsoft Gold Certified Partner. 
 In 2009, Opened TMA Mobile Solutions(TMS), and had one new office in Australia. 
 In 2010, Opened its first Research & Development (R&D) center called iRDC in Quang Trung Software City in Ho Chi Minh City. In 2011, TMA achieved CMMi Level 5, reached 1,000 employees
In 2012, 
 Joined CeBIT exhibition, demonstrating several products in Hanover, Germany. 
 A member of Viet Nam Software Association such as VINASA, Hochiminh Computer Association (HCA), etc.
In 2013, 
 Certified ISO 27001:2005 
 Established Japan Center (TJC)
 Established Big Data & Analytics group 
 Got double market in Australia.
In 2014, 
 Launched IMS (IT Managed Services) 
 Established T-Design Center (UX/UI) 
 Established IoT (Internet of Things) Group
 Reached 1,700 employees.
In 2015, 
 Reached 1,800 employees.
 Launched People Capability Maturity Model (People CMM)
 Launched broadcasting system for internal communication
In 2016,
 Launched Techday 2016  
 Established Business Analysis service  
 Launched E-Commerce, Microsoft and CRM solutions  
 Joined 25 community activities 
In 2017,
 Celebrated 20 years anniversary 
 Reached 2,000 employees 
 Awarded gold medal in software outsourcing for 14 consecutive years 
 Formed TMA Innovation Center
In 2018, 
 Established TMA Automotive Software Center
 Established TMAsia in Singapore
 Established TMA Binh Dinh
 Start construction TMA Innovation Park in Quy Nhon
 Established TMA Blockchain Development Center
 Established TMA DevOps Service Center
In 2019, 

 Reached 2,500 employees
 Recognized as one of Vietnam’s Top 10 Industry 4.0 companies
 Established 2nd data science group at TMA Innovation Park in Quy Nhon
 First 5G application
 First customer from Taiwan
 Tripled Korean market

In 2020,

 Opened TMA Innovation Park in central Vietnam
 Launched Innovation as a Service
 Established HealthTech Center, Smart Device Center, Robot Software Center, 5G Center

In 2021

 Reached 3,000 employees
 Market expansion to 30 countries
 Established TMA Europe Office in Germany
 Recognized as one of Vietnam’s Top 10 ICT Companies, AI & IoT Enterprises, Fintech Enterprises
 TMA Innovation Park in Quy Nhon reach 250 engineers supporting clients from 15 countries

Offices 

 Vietnam: Ho Chi Minh City
 USA: San Jose
 Canada: Ottawa
 Germany: Munich
 Australia: Melbourne
 Japan: Tokyo
 Singapore: Singapore

References 

Software companies of Vietnam
Companies based in Ho Chi Minh City
Software companies established in 1997
Outsourcing companies
Vietnamese brands
Vietnamese companies established in 1997